The 63rd Hong Kong Macau Interport was held in Hong Kong on 10 June 2007. Hong Kong captured the champion by winning 2-1. This was a FIFA-recognised full international match.

Squads

Hong Kong
The following shows part of the squad only. The number of caps is as of before the match.

Macau

 Chief Director: Vitor Cheung
 Directors: Chong Coc Veng, Sin Chi Yiu, Chang Chin Nam
 Head Coach:  Masanaga Kageyama
 Coaches: 容楚英, Chu Hon Ming William
 Administrator: 梁恩庭

Results

References

Hong Kong–Macau Interport
Macau
Hong